Combe Saragosse (aka la Combe Saragosse) is a district of Besançon, capital and principal city of the Franche-Comté region in eastern France. One of the last urban area of Besançon, Combe Saragosse, is located in the northeast of the city, bordering the Orchamps and Palente.

References

Areas of Besançon